Lasso was a short-video sharing app by Facebook.

Lasso was launched on iOS and Android and was aimed at teenagers.

On July 2, 2020, Facebook announced that Lasso would be shutting down July 10. It has since been shut down. Currently Lasso was merged with Instagram, to relaunch as Instagram Reels.

Features 
The application connected with Facebook, among other social media platforms, and allowed users to upload their short videos with music and find trending videos via Lasso's hashtag tracking.

Competition 
Lasso was directly competing with TikTok, a viral 15 second video app that merged with Musical.ly in August 2018.

References

Social media
Meta Platforms applications